This is a list of programs broadcast by Canal 9, a Danish television channel.

TV series

Sports reality/documentary series

 The Best Football Funnies Ever
 Bullrun
 Bullrun: Cops, Cars & Superstars
 Bullrun Rally
 Burnout
 Epic Conditions
 Football's Greatest
 International Football Rivalries
 Jakt och Fiske
 Magic Of The FA Cup
 Pros vs. Joes
 Season On The Edge
 Shaq Vs.
 World's Best Putter Australia
 The World's Wackiest Sports

Drama series

 The A-Team
 Cheers
 Frasier
 Magnum, P.I.
 Miami Vice
 M*A*S*H
 MacGyver
 Nash Bridges
 Walker, Texas Ranger
 Band of Brothers
 Battlestar Galactica
 Beyond the Darklands
 The Bold and the Beautiful
 Caprica
 Covert Affairs
 Crash
 The Dead Zone
 Dr. Quinn, Medicine Woman
 Earth 2
 Fringe
 Forever
 From the Earth to the Moon
 Futurama
 Galactica 1980
 Gunslingers
 Hill Street Blues
 In Plain Sight
 JAG
 The Kennedys
 Law & Order
 Law & Order: Criminal Intent
 Law & Order: Special Victims Unit
 Major Crimes
 Medium
 Monk
 Monty Python's Flying Circus
 The Practice
 The Ricky Gervais Show
 The Shield
 Six Feet Under
 The Sopranos
 Spartacus: Gods of the Arena
 Spartacus: Blood and Sand
 Spartacus: Vengeance
 Spartacus: War of the Damned
 Star Trek: Deep Space Nine
 Steven Seagal: Lawman
 Water Rats
 The Wire

Reality/documentary series

 American Loggers
 BBQ Pitmasters
 Airplane Repo
 How It's Made
 Treehouse Masters
 Outback Truckers
 Food Factory USA
 Adoption Diaries
 After the First 48
 American Gangster
 American Guns
 Animal Squad
 Asian Crime
 Beach Patrol
 Behind Bars: World's Toughest Prisons
 Beyond The Headlines Biography Borderline Brit Cops Bullied: You're Not Alone Buying Alaska Campus Vets Cheaters Chopper Rescue CIA Secret Wars Cops Cops Reloaded Courage in Red Crash Investigation Unit Crash Scene Investigators The Crime Chronicles Crime Stories Crimes that Shook Britain D.C. Children's Lifeline Deals from the Dark Side Dirty Jobs Doctors and Nurses at War Dog Patrol Dominick Dunne's Power, Privilege, and Justice The FBI Files Fifth Gear The First 48 The First 48: The Killer Speaks The First 48: Missing Persons Forensic Files Fraud Squad TV Ghost Adventures Helicopter Heroes Highway Patrol Hogan Knows Best How Clean Is Your Crime Scene Human Wrecking Balls I Survived... Ice Pilots NWT The Incurables Inside The Firestorm Interpol Investigates Intensive Care Unit Intervention It Could Happen Tomorrow Lifeline Lost Treasure Hunters Maternity Ward Medics Missing Most Daring Mostly True Stories: Urban Legends Revealed Noise Cops Obsessed Oddities On Patrol With Santa Barbara PD Operation Repo Outcast Kustoms Pawn Stars Police Patrol Prison Wives Psychic Kids Pushing the Limit Quest For K2 Real Rescues Railroad Alaska Resident Life Road Wars Rookies Sea Patrol UK Serious Crash Unit Shark Chasers Special Delivery: Baby ER State Parole Storm Chasers Storm Stories Street Law Stunt Stars Surf Patrol Surgeon Survival with Ray Mears Ten 7 Aotearoa The Suspects Top 20 Countdown Top Shot Trouble In Paradise Vanished With Beth Holloway Way of Life Where Were You? Events that Changed the World Wild Animal ER Women Behind Bars Women of Justice World of Stupid World War II Lost Films World's Toughest Cops''

References

Canal 9 Denmark, List of programs broadcast by
Television stations in Denmark
TV4 AB